In United States federal agricultural law, the terminology Actual Production History (APH) denotes a record of an agricultural producer’s crop yields over a multi-year period.  Such records are used by the Federal Crop Insurance Corporation to determine “normal” production levels for a producer.  The term "Actual Production History insurance" is used synonymously with Multi-Peril Crop Insurance.

References 

Agriculture in the United States